Bukówiec Górny  is a village in the administrative district of Gmina Włoszakowice, within Leszno County, Greater Poland Voivodeship, in west-central Poland.

The village has a population of 1,600.

Local Legend
One stormy day, after finishing work, the foremen from Bukówiec went to a nearby liquor store and, as was their habit after finishing work, they celebrated the end of their work. When they knocked down 0.7 l of Stork, a short foreman said that it was time to go home and, returning home from his shoes in the dark, did not notice an open drain on a nearby road. It blew lightly and the foreman flew into the manhole, twisted his ankle and couldn't get back out. He screamed for help but no one heard him, the well was slammed shut by the strong wind and no one saw or heard of him later. The wife tried to report the matter to the police but unfortunately the search yielded nothing because no one expected that he was in a closed well. When he spent a year and a half there, suddenly something changed in him and, as part of revenge, he started attacking cars that were driving along this road. The whole action was that when he heard nearby cars, he leaned out of the drain and spilled a slippery substance on the road, after which the car skidded at full speed and rolled over or ended up in a nearby ditch. Once he managed to get a truck, he climbed onto the truck bed and robbed it. Children hearing this legend avoid this road from afar and the daredevils who went there have not returned. And so this monster from the well prowls there to this day and attacks nearby cars because no one has the courage to go inside and eliminate it.

References

Villages in Leszno County